The Pythons Autobiography by The Pythons is the official autobiography of the Monty Python team, released in 2003. It covers the whole of Python history, from their childhoods all the way through to the 30th anniversary celebrations in 1999.

The book was edited by Bob McCabe from interviews held with John Cleese, Terry Gilliam, Eric Idle, Terry Jones and Michael Palin. Interspersed with these are archive interviews with Graham Chapman as well as new contributions from Chapman’s partner David Sherlock, his brother John, and sister-in-law Pam. The book also features excerpts from the personal diaries of Terry Jones and Michael Palin, alongside many previously unseen photographs from the team’s personal archives.

Originally released as a large format hardback, in the style of The Beatles Anthology book, it was later issued as a smaller paperback version.  A 2-CD set of interviews recorded for the book was released simultaneously.

Contents
In Which The Pythons Meet The PythonsTerry Jones slags off the othersMichael Palin blows the gaff on the PythonsEric Idle bares his soul about the restJohn Cleese talks about himself in relation to the othersGraham Chapman speaks from beyond the voidTerry Gilliam pisses on the Pythons
In Which We Are BornEric IdleMichael PalinJohn CleeseTerry JonesGraham ChapmanTerry Gilliam
In Which We Pretend To Grow UpUniversitiesLife before the Circus
’It’s…’Monty Python’s Flying CircusAnd Now For Something Completely DifferentThe giant has been stung
In Which We All Become StarletsMonty Python and the Holy GrailLife of BrianThe Bowl of Life
The Meaning Of Death
…And Beyond

Credits

Writers - Graham Chapman, John Cleese, Terry Gilliam, Eric Idle, Terry Jones, Michael Palin
Contributing writers - David Sherlock, John Chapman, Pam Chapman
Editor - Bob McCabe
Designer - Harry Green

References

Monty Python literature
Autobiographies
2003 non-fiction books